Tahar Allan was the Algerian minister for posts and telecommunications in the 1992 government of Belaid Abdessalam.

References 

Possibly living people
Year of birth missing
Algerian politicians